The UMass Minutemen baseball team is a varsity intercollegiate athletic team of the University of Massachusetts Amherst in Amherst, Massachusetts, United States. The team is a member of the Atlantic 10 Conference, which is part of the National Collegiate Athletic Association's Division I. Massachusetts' first baseball team was fielded in 1877. The team plays its home games at Earl Lorden Field in Amherst, Massachusetts. The Minutemen are coached by Matt Reynolds.

Coaching history

UMass in the NCAA Tournament

UMass alumni in the MLB

 Doug Clark
 Gary DiSarcina
 Nick Gorneault
 Bob Hansen
 Lee King
 Greg LaRocca
 Mark Brown
 Ed Connolly
 Chick Davies
 Mike Flanagan
 Kenny Greer
 Ralph Lumenti
 Chad Paronto
 Jeff Reardon
 Steve Shea
 Joe Sherman
 Dave Telgheder
 Ron Villone

See also
List of NCAA Division I baseball programs

References

External links
 

 
Baseball teams established in 1877
1877 establishments in Massachusetts